Söderby-Karl is a locality situated in Norrtälje Municipality, Stockholm County, Sweden with 231 inhabitants in 2010.

Söderby-Karl Church, dating from the Middle Ages, lies in Söderby-Karl.

References 

Populated places in Norrtälje Municipality